R. Lalthangliana  is a Mizo politician and academic in Mizoram, India. He is currently a Cabinet Minister in the present Mizo National Front ministry and holds the portfolios of Health, Education and Commerce. He has been elected to the Mizoram Legislative Assembly from the South Tuipui constituency.

Career
Dr. R Lalthangliana started his career teaching in Pachhunga University College and was Assistant professor before he was elected to the Mizoram Legislative Assembly. He has been elected to the Mizoram Legislative Assembly in 1989, 1993, 1998, 2003 and 2008.

Education
He has completed his high school in Serkawn Christian School and completed his BA in St. Edmunds College in 1978 after which he completed his M.A. in NEHU in 1980 in Shillong after which he completed his Ph.D. from North-Eastern Hill University in Sociology.

References

Mizoram politicians
People from Lunglei district
Living people
Mizo people
Mizo National Front politicians
North-Eastern Hill University alumni
1956 births
Mizoram MLAs 2018–2023